Eutaea or Eutaia was a town in the south of ancient Arcadia, in the district Maenalia, probably between Asea and Pallantium, though not on the road between these towns.

Its site is located near the modern Lianou.

References

Populated places in ancient Arcadia
Former populated places in Greece